Muling Buksan ang Puso (International title: If Only / ) is a 2013 Philippine melodrama television series, directed by Nuel C. Naval and Manny Q. Palo, starring an ensemble cast spanning three generations led by Julia Montes, Enrique Gil, and Enchong Dee in a heart-wrenching story about the beauty and the dark side of love. The series aired on ABS-CBN's Primetime Bida evening block and worldwide on The Filipino Channel from July 8, 2013 to October 4, 2013, replacing Apoy sa Dagat.

This series is currently streaming on Kapamilya Online Live Global every Tuesdays, 3:00am-5:00am replacing Oh My G!.

Cast and characters

Main cast
Julia Montes as Sarah Beltran-Dela Vega / Sarah B. Salazar-Dela Vega / Sarah B. Dela Vega 
Enrique Gil as Francisco "Francis" B. Dela Vega / Francisco "Francis" Andrada / Francisco "Francis" Beltran
Enchong Dee as Leonel Bernardo Beltran / Leonel Bernardo B. Cabigas

Supporting cast
Susan Roces as Doña Adelina Laurel-Beltran 
Pilar Pilapil as Elvira Santelices
Dante Rivero as Bernardo Beltran
Cherie Gil as Marietta Beltran
Agot Isidro as Carissa Beltran-Dela Vega
Jestoni Alarcon as Nicholas Salazar / Ricardo Espinosa
Daniel Fernando as Ignacio Andrada
Dominic Ochoa as Edmund Dela Vega
Malou Crisologo as Lavida Salvacion
Jane Oineza as Natalia Mercado
Matt Evans as Pancho Mercado
Pooh as Xenon Mercado

Guest cast
Bon Vidar as Mayor
Paolo O'Hara as Simeon
Ydda Yaneza as Ika Manlapas
Jong Cuenco as Atty. San Pedro
Menggie Cobarrubias as Arturo Rivera
Froilan Sales

Special participation
Christopher de Leon as Anton "El Patron" Silvestre / Anton Cabigas
Bembol Roco as Ernie Cabigas
Dimples Romana as young Adelina Laurel-Beltran
Iza Calzado as young Elvira Santelices
Joem Bascon as young Bernardo Beltran
Belle Mariano as young Sarah Beltran
Lukas Magallano as young Francis Dela Vega
Joaquin Reyes as young Leonel Beltran
Bryan Santos as young Anton Silvestre / Anton Cabigas

Production
Initially, Muling Buksan ang Puso was originally planned to be premiered back-to-back with Got to Believe on July 8, 2013, replacing Apoy Sa Dagat and Missing You. But due to the request of Koreanovela fans and the postponement of Got to Believe in favor of Korean drama That Winter, the Wind Blows, it was first premiered in the 8:30-9:15pm timeslot instead, taking over the timeslot previously occupied by Huwag Ka Lang Mawawala. On August 26, 2013, the series later moved to the original 9:15-10:00pm timeslot to give way for Got to Believe.

Casting changes

Amalia Fuentes was initially part of the cast to play Elvira, but due to misconception of her role, she later dropped it and she was replaced by Pilar Pilapil. After dropping her role on the said TV series, she had a special participation role in the critically acclaimed TV series Huwag Ka Lang Mawawala top billed by Judy Ann Santos.

Soundtrack

The main theme song is called "Muling Buksan ang Puso" and has three versions, two are sung as a solo by singers Lani Misalucha and Erik Santos, while the third as a duet. The song was originally sung by Basil Valdez for a 1985 Serialized Comic to film, starring Vilma Santos and Lorna Tolentino. Other singers also provided revivals of many Philippine hit songs for the soundtrack. Charice sang a cover of the song "Yakap", originally by Filipino-Spanish singer Júnior. Angeline Quinto covered the song "Dapat Ka Bang Mahalin?", by Sharon Cuneta. Juris provided a revival of "Paano Kita Mapasasalamatan?" popularized by Kuh Ledesma. Jed Madela sings "Sinasamba Kita", by Rey Valera. The soundtrack album was released by Star Music on July 31, 2013.

Reception

Muling Buksan ang Puso has captivated more viewers nationwide after it hit its all-time high national TV ratings of 30.4% on July 24, 2013 based on data from Kantar Media Philippines covering urban and rural homes nationwide. During its 8:30pm airing, it peaked 32.7% on August 2, 2013. On its 9:15pm timeslot, it peaked 25.7% on its finale episode on October 4, 2013. The series also ranked 10th in the Top 15 programs from January to December 2013 based on year round data from Kantar Media Philippines with an average rating of 30.4%.

Muling Buksan ang Puso and casts were nominated at the PMPC Star Awards for TV, an annual award giving body recognizing the outstanding programming produced by the several TV networks in the Philippines every year.

Accolades

International broadcast
  (Broadcast channel: Astro Bella)
 Kenya (Broadcast channel: NTV) 1 October to 16 November 2018

References

See also
List of programs broadcast by ABS-CBN
List of telenovelas of ABS-CBN

ABS-CBN drama series
Philippine romance television series
Philippine melodrama television series
Television series by Dreamscape Entertainment Television
2013 Philippine television series debuts
2013 Philippine television series endings
Filipino-language television shows
Television shows set in the Philippines